Anush Yeghiazaryan (born June 15, 1965), is an Armenian artist. Honorary Professor of Moscow State Pedagogical University (2016).

Biography
Anush Yeghiazaryan was born in Yerevan, Armenia, in the family of RA Honored Artist, the patriarch of Armenian school of art weaving Karapet Yeghiazaryan.

1984–1990 studied in the Graphic Department of Yerevan's State Fine Arts Academy.
1991–1994 studied at the PhD course of the State Armenian Pedagogical University after Kh. Abovyan.
1996 Member of the Armenian Union of Artists.
1991–2014 gave lectures at the State Armenian Pedagogical University after Kh. Abovyan.
2003 received docent degree
2008 defended doctorate thesis at the State Armenian Pedagogical University after Kh. Abovyan and received Doctor's degree
2009 Member of the Bureau of the Decorative-Practical Art Branch of the RA Painters Union
2009 Chairperson of Design and Practical Decorative department of the Armenian Pedagogical University after Kh. Abovyan
2010 Member of the Pan-Armenian Painting Association
2011 received Professor's degree
2013 Member of the Executive Body of the RA Painters Union

Yeghiazaryan's work
Anush Yeghiazaryan is the outstanding participant of the present stage of development of the Armenian tapestry.  Since childhood she has absorbed in herself an atmosphere of creative workshop of the artist, early learned to weave and improvise with various texture and materials. 
Anush Yeghiazaryan is a bright representative of modern textile avant-garde in Armenia though she is not alien either to the Armenian traditional carpet, or to the classical West – European tapestry. Many – sided nature of her talent and variety of her creative interests are obvious and promising.

Anush Yeghiazaryan is the author of many articles, methodic brochures etc.

Exhibitions 
Anush Yeghiazaryan has taken part in many art exhibitions, in many countries – Yerevan, Moscow, Sankt Peterburg, Bouve, Plovdil, Tehran, Paris, Italy, Praha.
2010 Personal Exhibition in Artists' Union of Armenia

Quotes
I have not chosen my art, it's in my blood. It's my life style and I love it up to sublimation degree.

See also
List of Armenian artists
List of Armenians
Culture of Armenia

References

External links
 Decorative and Applied Arts Revive National Crafts

1965 births
Armenian painters
Living people
Artists from Yerevan